Guillermo Enrique Martínez (born October 5, 1984) is the hitting coach of the Toronto Blue Jays of Major League Baseball (MLB). Prior to his coaching career, he spent several seasons as a shortstop in the Florida Marlins organization.

Professional career
Martínez was selected in the 17th round of the 2003 Major League Baseball draft by the Chicago White Sox, but did not sign and then attended the University of South Alabama. In the 2006 draft, the Florida Marlins selected him in the 15th round. Martínez appeared in 36 games for the Short Season-A Jamestown Jammers in 2006, batting .193 with 11 runs batted in (RBI). In 2007 he played for the Class-A Greensboro Grasshoppers and the Advanced-A Jupiter Hammerheads, and hit a combined .260 with one home run and seven RBI in 48 games. Martínez played his final season with the Marlins organization in 2008, hitting .201 in 61 games for Jupiter.

In 2009, Martínez hit .304 with three home runs, 31 RBI, and 28 stolen bases for the Windy City ThunderBolts of the independent Frontier League. He split the 2010 season with the ThunderBolts and the Lake County Fielders of the Northern League, and played his final season of professional baseball with the American Association's Grand Prairie AirHogs in 2011.

Coaching
In 2012, Martínez was hired by the Toronto Blue Jays as a minor league hitting and infield coach. On November 16, 2018, he was promoted to the position of hitting coach at the major league level, replacing Brook Jacoby. Guillermo Martinez was ejected prior to the Blue Jays game June 22, 2022 against the Chicago White Sox following a heated lineup card exchange that stemmed from an issue from the June 21 game. While exchanging lineup cards, Martinez confronted home plate umpire Doug Eddings about questionable calls made during the previous game. On June 24, 2022, MLB suspended Martinez five games for making contact with Eddings and "for his unsportsmanlike conduct during the pregame lineup card exchange." Martinez was also fined an undisclosed amount.

References

External links

1984 births
Living people
American expatriate baseball people in Canada
Baseball coaches from Florida
Baseball players from Miami
Sports coaches from Miami
Baseball shortstops
Baseball second basemen
Baseball third basemen
Grand Prairie AirHogs players
Greensboro Grasshoppers players
Jamestown Jammers players
Jupiter Hammerheads players
Major League Baseball hitting coaches
Minor league baseball coaches
Toronto Blue Jays coaches
Windy City ThunderBolts players
South Alabama Jaguars baseball players
Nicaraguan expatriate baseball players in the United States
Nicaraguan expatriates in Canada